Salisbury Black Friary was a friary in Wiltshire, England.

References

Monasteries in Wiltshire
History of Salisbury
Buildings and structures in Salisbury